Holy Trinity High School Kenema may refer to:

United Kingdom
Holy Trinity School, Crawley, Crawley, West Sussex

United States
Holy Trinity Diocesan High School, in Hicksville, New York
Holy Trinity High School (Chicago), in Chicago, Illinois
Holy Trinity High School (Fort Madison, Iowa)
Holy Trinity High School (Winsted, Minnesota), in Winsted, Minnesota
Holy Trinity High School (Roxbury, Massachusetts), former Catholic high school for girls, located in Roxbury, Massachusetts

Canada
Holy Trinity Catholic Secondary School (Oakville), in Oakville, Ontario
Holy Trinity High School (Bradford), in Bradford, Ontario
Holy Trinity Academy (Drayton Valley), in Drayton Valley, Alberta
Holy Trinity Catholic High School (Edmonton), in Edmonton, Alberta
Holy Trinity High School (Torbay), in Torbay, Newfoundland

Jamaica
Holy Trinity High School, Jamaica

See also 
Holy Trinity School (disambiguation)
Holy Trinity Catholic High School (disambiguation)